Sputnik was a JavaScript conformance test suite. The purpose of the test suite was to determine how well a JavaScript implementation adheres to the ECMA-262 specification, 5th edition, looking only at those features that were also present in the 3rd edition. It contained over 5000 tests that touched all aspects of the JavaScript language.

The test was created in Russia for testing the conformance of the V8 JavaScript engine used in Google Chrome.

As part of phasing out Google Labs, Google has shut down Sputnik. All current Sputnik tests have been incorporated into ECMA's Test262 test suite.

Browsers that do not pass
As an example of a browser that does not pass, Konqueror 4.10.1 still only passes 91.8% of the 11573 tests.

Desktop browsers

Scores represent the number of failed tests – a perfect score is 0 (100%).

ECMAScript testsuite
Google has handed the tests from Sputnik test suite to Ecma International for inclusion in its ECMAScript 262 test suite. Some Sputnik tests however have been found to have issues and do not conform to ECMAScript 5th edition specification.

Mobile browsers

See also

Acid3

References

External links
ECMAScript Test262 (Sputnik) official page
Source Code on Google Code

Software testing
Web browsers
Discontinued Google software